Zingara (Italian for "female Gypsy", plural zingare) may refer to:

 "Zingara" (song) (1969), a song by Enrico Riccardi and Luigi Albertelli
 Zingara (film) (1969), a film directed by Mariano Laurenti
 Zingara (ship), an Italian cargo vessel wrecked in 1984
 Zingara (Conan), a nation in the fictional world of Conan the Barbarian
 À la zingara, a garnish in French cuisine
 La zingara (1822), an opera semiseria in two acts by Gaetano Donizetti
 "La zingara" (1845), a song by Giuseppe Verdi

See also
 The Bohemian Girl (1844), an operetta by Michael Balfe